The Para gnatcatcher (Polioptila paraensis) or Klages's gnatcatcher, is a species of bird in the family Polioptilidae. It is endemic to Brazil.

Taxonomy and systematics

The Para gnatcatcher is monotypic It was formerly treated as a subspecies of the Guianan gnatcatcher (Polioptila guianensis) but since mid-2019 has been considered a separate species based on differences in morphology and vocalization.

Description

The male's head, back, and breast are mouse gray and the rest of its underparts white. There is minimal contrast between the throat, breast, and belly. The innermost feathers of its tail are black and the outermost white, with those between intergrading. The female is similar but has a paler face.

Distribution and habitat

The Para gnatcatcher is found only in Brazil, in a broad band south of the Amazon River from its mouth southwest almost to northern Bolivia. It inhabits the borders and canopy of humid primary forest, mostly below  elevation.

Behavior

Feeding

The Para gnatcatcher's diet is little known but is assumed to be arthropods like that of other Polioptila gnatcatchers. It actively forages in the canopy and sub-canopy.

Breeding

The Para gnatcatcher's breeding phenology has not been documented.

Vocalization

The Para gnatcatcher's song is "repeated high...notes, evenly delivered" .

Status

The IUCN has not assessed the Para gnatcatcher. "Of the ecoregions occupied by this species, only one (Tocantins/Pindare moist forest) is considered to be at serious risk."

References

Para gnatcatcher
Birds of the Brazilian Amazon
Endemic birds of Brazil
Para gnatcatcher
Para gnatcatcher